The bluethroat pikeblenny (Chaenopsis ocellata) is a species of chaenopsid blenny found in coral reefs in the western Atlantic ocean. It can reach a maximum length of  TL. It can also be found in the commercial aquarium trade.

References
 Gill, T. N. 1865 (May) On a new family type of fishes related to the blennioids. Annals of the Lyceum of Natural History of New York v. 8 (art. 15): 141–144, Pl. 3. [Reprint published between May and July 1865, plate probably in 1866.]

External links
 

ocellata
Fish of the Caribbean
bluethroat pikeblenny